Erie High School may refer to one of several high schools in the United States:

Erie High School (Colorado) in Erie, Colorado
Erie High School (Illinois) in Erie, Illinois
Erie High School (Kansas) in Erie, Kansas
Erie High School (Pennsylvania), in Erie, Pennsylvania